Rolling In It is a British game show that has aired on ITV from 8 August 2020 to 18 December 2021 and is hosted by Stephen Mulhern.

Gameplay

Main game
Three teams compete, each consisting of a celebrity and a civilian contestant. The centrepiece of the studio is a wide, slowly moving conveyor belt. At one end is a launcher loaded with giant coins that pivots from side to side; the other has a trough whose 10 slots display values/effects that can change during the game. Pressing a button on top of the launcher releases one coin to roll along the conveyor, and the result is determined by the slot into which it falls.

The host starts the game by rolling one coin to determine the initial amount of each team's prize pot. For this roll, eight of the slots display values of £1,000, £2,500, or £5,000, and the two outermost slots are "Roll Again," which allow another roll with no effect on gameplay. Fifteen questions are asked during the main game, each with three answer options, and one team is chosen at random to have initial control.

The team in control rolls a coin; if it lands in a money slot, the host asks a question. A correct answer adds the value to the team's prize pot, and they may either roll another coin or pass control to the next team in line. An incorrect answer ends their turn and gives control to the next team.

The "Roll Again" slots remain in place throughout the game, while the other eight are shuffled before the first, fourth, seventh, tenth, thirteenth, and fifteenth questions. Penalty slots appear at times, which end the team's turn without a question being asked and also have the following effects:

 Bankrupt: Resets the prize pot to zero.
 Half: Cuts the prize pot in half.
 Lose: Deducts the indicated amount (£2,500 or £5,000) from the prize pot. 

Slot values increase during the game, with the maximum rising to £25,000 by the final question. "Steal" slots also come into play, allowing a team to take all the money from one opponent's prize pot if they answer correctly.

After the last question has been asked, the team with the highest prize pot advances to the Bank Roll for a chance to win it. In the event of a tie, the first team to roll a coin into a money slot and correctly answer a question will advance, with the amount of the roll added to their prize pot.

Bank Roll
All of the slots except for the two "Roll Again" are blanked out, and the team is given 60 seconds to answer as many open-ended questions as possible. The members may confer, but only responses from the contestant are counted. Each correct answer or pass/miss marks a slot as "WIN" or "LOSE," respectively, working from left to right. After all eight slots have been marked, the team may continue answering questions and turn a "LOSE" into a "WIN" for each correct answer.

Once time runs out, the team rolls one coin. The contestant wins the entire prize pot if it lands in "WIN," or nothing if it lands in "LOSE."

Transmissions

Series

Special

International versions

References

External links
 
 

2020 British television series debuts
2021 British television series endings
2020s British game shows
English-language television shows
ITV game shows